Frieda Dänzer (16 November 1930 – 21 January 2015) was a Swiss Alpine skier, successful in the second half of the 1950s. At the 1956 Winter Olympics, she won silver in the downhill event. At Bad Gastein in 1958, she became world champion in Alpine Combined and won the silver medal in downhill and bronze in giant slalom. She was born in Adelboden, Canton of Bern.

Dänzer developed into one of Switzerland's most successful female skiers in the 1950s. The start of her sporting career, however, was fraught with a number of hurdles. In January 1950, she suffered a compound fracture of her right tibia and fibula in a fall that put her out of action for six months. After her recovery, Dänzer did manage to rejoin the Swiss national team.  In 1954, however, she was not taken to the World Championships in Åre, although she had shortly before become Swiss champion in the downhill on the Lauberhorn in Wengen.

References

 Frieda Dänzer's obituary

External links 
 

1930 births
2015 deaths
Swiss female alpine skiers
Olympic alpine skiers of Switzerland
Olympic silver medalists for Switzerland
Olympic medalists in alpine skiing
Medalists at the 1956 Winter Olympics
Alpine skiers at the 1956 Winter Olympics
People from Frutigen-Niedersimmental District
Sportspeople from the canton of Bern
20th-century Swiss women